Horace Elliott Bowden (5 November 1880 – 23 August 1958) was an Australian politician who represented the South Australian House of Assembly seat of Gouger from 1943 to 1944 for the Labor Party.

References

 

1880 births
1958 deaths
Members of the South Australian House of Assembly
Australian Labor Party members of the Parliament of South Australia
20th-century Australian politicians